Half a Boy/Half a Man is a studio album by George Thorogood and the Destroyers.  It was released on April 13, 1999, on the CMC International label.  The album failed to chart in any capacity. Its first single, "I Don't Trust Nobody," peaked at #24 on the Billboard Mainstream Rock charts, making it the band's final single to chart.

Track listing
  "I Don't Trust Nobody" (Eddie Shaw) – 5:02 
  "Double Shot" (Don Smith, Cyril Vetter) – 3:12 
  "99 Days in Jail" (Willie Dixon, L. P. Weaver) – 3:53 
  "Half a Boy, Half a Man" (Nick Lowe) – 3:27 
  "As Long as I Have You" (Dixon) – 4:04 
  "B.I.G.T.I.M.E." (Keith Sykes) – 3:07 
  "Be Bop Grandma" (Solomon Burke, Delores Burke) – 3:58 
  "Nothing New" (Dave Bartholomew, Fats Domino, Jack Jessup, Murphy Maddux) – 3:24 
  "Just Passin' Thru" (George Thorogood) – 4:43 
  "Hellbound Train (Downbound Train)" (Chuck Berry) – 4:56 
  "Not Tonight, I Have a Heartache" (Thorogood) – 3:22

References

George Thorogood and the Destroyers albums
1999 albums
CMC International albums
Albums produced by Terry Manning